North East Learning Trust is a multi-academy trust (MAT) that operates nine schools with academy status across northern England: three are primary schools and five are secondary. One is a ITT training school. It is an exempt charity, regulated by the Department for Education.

History
The trust was founded in 2011, growing out of the Shotton Hall single academy trust. It was a founder member of the Northern Alliance of Trusts.

Academies

Primary
 Browney Primary Academy

 Diamond Hall Junior Academy

 Sacriston Academy

Secondary
The Academy at Shotton Hall

Ashington Academy

Bedlington Academy

Easington Academy

 Hermitage Academy
Rye Hills Academy

Teesdale School and Sixth Form

References

External links
 Launchpad for Literacy

Multi-academy trusts